Kajana is an administrative ward in Buhigwe District  of Kigoma Region of Tanzania. In 2016 the Tanzania National Bureau of Statistics report there were 14,731 people in the ward, from 13,383 in 2012.

Villages / neighborhoods 
The ward has 2 villages and 10 hamlets.

 Kajana 
 Kajana
 Kwikungu
 Kisenga
 Rubuga
 Munyika
 Nyarushanga
 Katundu 
 Rubona
 Nyarudaho
 Nyamalembe
 Mugongo

References

Buhigwe District
Wards of Kigoma Region